Agros may refer to:

Agros, Cyprus, a village in the Troodos Mountains, Cyprus
Agros, Greece, a village in the island of Corfu, Greece